Amnon Weiss is an Israeli businessman and a former paralympic champion.

Weiss has a light disability due to polio. In his youth he joined the Israel Sports Center for the Disabled, where he practiced various fields of athletics alongside studies of psychology at Bar Ilan University. Later on he studied law.

A member of the Israeli delegation to the Stoke Mandeville Games, Weiss was a gold-medal champion in javelin and shot put. Prior to the 1968 Paralympic Games he won four medals at the 1967 Stoke Mandeville Games (two silver, in shot put and javelin and two bronze, in club throw and discus) and was the national champion in shot put. At the Paralympic Games Weiss was a member of the gold medal-winning wheelchair basketball team and won three medals in athletics.

In the early 1970s, Weiss and his wife Daniela were among the founding members of Gush Emunim, later settling in Kedumim where Daniela was elected to head the local council. Their son-in-law Avraham Gavish was killed in a terrorist attack in 2002.

Weiss was the owner of a goldsmith business, later dealing with real-estate and in 2005 investing in the establishment of Gvaot Winery.

References

External links
 

1943 births
Living people
People from Ramat Gan
Paralympic athletes of Israel
Athletes (track and field) at the 1968 Summer Paralympics
Paralympic wheelchair basketball players of Israel
Israeli men's wheelchair basketball players
Wheelchair basketball players at the 1968 Summer Paralympics
Paralympic silver medalists for Israel
Paralympic bronze medalists for Israel
Wheelchair category Paralympic competitors
Israeli businesspeople
Israeli settlers
Medalists at the 1968 Summer Paralympics
Israeli male discus throwers
Israeli male javelin throwers
Track and field athletes with disabilities
Paralympic gold medalists for Israel
Paralympic medalists in athletics (track and field)
Paralympic medalists in wheelchair basketball